Dubki is a rural locality (a village) in Sizemskoye Rural Settlement, Sheksninsky District, Vologda Oblast, Russia. The population was 35 as of 2010.

Geography 
Dubki is located 64 km northeast of Sheksna (the district's administrative centre) by road. Sizma is the nearest rural locality.

References 

Rural localities in Sheksninsky District